Morys George Lyndhurst Bruce, 4th Baron Aberdare,  (16 June 1919 – 23 January 2005), was a Conservative politician, and from 1999 until his death, one of ninety-two elected hereditary peers in the British House of Lords. He was the eldest son of Clarence Bruce, 3rd Baron Aberdare, and Margaret Bethune Black, and succeeded to his father's title on the latter's death in 1957.

Education
Bruce was educated at Sandroyd School before heading to Winchester College and New College, Oxford, where he read Politics, Philosophy and Economics.

Career

In 1939 he joined the British Army, commissioned with the rank of lieutenant in the Welsh Guards; he would eventually reach the rank of captain, after having served in various staff positions with XII Corps, the 21st Army Group, and XXX Corps during and after World War II.

He joined the J. Arthur Rank Organisation in 1947, working there for two years before moving to the British Broadcasting Corporation, where he worked between 1949 and 1956. In 1970, he became Minister of State for the Department of Health and Social Security; in 1974, he was appointed to the Privy Council and became a Minister without Portfolio. Between 1976 and 1992, he served as Chairman of Committees of the House of Lords, (Deputy Speaker of the House of Lords). In 1984, he was created a Knight Commander of the Order of the British Empire, and he would serve various positions within the Order of St John of Jerusalem. After the House of Lords Act 1999 prevented hereditary peers from sitting in the Lords solely by virtue of their peerages, Lord Aberdare became one of the ninety-two hereditary peers elected to stay in the House of Lords.

On 24 August 1992, he officially opened Chester City's new football stadium, the Deva Stadium.

Lord Aberdare was a lifelong devotee of real tennis, winning the British amateur singles championship four times between 1953 and 1957, and the amateur doubles championship four times between 1954 and 1961. He served as president of the Tennis and Rackets Association from 1972 until 2004. During his tenure there was a significant expansion in both real tennis and rackets, and a number of new courts were built while several others were re-opened. His book, The JT Faber Book of Tennis and Rackets (London: Quiller Press, 2001. ), is the most comprehensive modern reference for these sports.

Lord Aberdare was President of the London Welsh Trust, which runs the London Welsh Centre, from 1959 until 1962, and from 1969 to 1970.

Family
In 1946 he married Maud Helen Sarah Dashwood, daughter of Sir John Lindsay Dashwood, 10th Baronet, and Helen Moira Eaton. They had four children:

 Alastair John Lyndhurst Bruce, 5th Baron Aberdare (b. 2 May 1947)
 James Henry Morys Bruce (b. 28 Dec 1948), married and has issue
 Henry Adam Francis Bruce (b. 5 Feb 1962), married and has issue
 Charles Benjamin Bruce (b. 29 May 1965)

References

External links 
 

1919 births
2005 deaths
Alumni of New College, Oxford
Welsh Guards officers
British Army personnel of World War II
Conservative Party (UK) hereditary peers
Knights Commander of the Order of the British Empire
Members of the Privy Council of the United Kingdom
People educated at Sandroyd School
People educated at Winchester College
Deputy Lieutenants of Dyfed
Bailiffs Grand Cross of the Order of St John
Eldest sons of British hereditary barons
Morys
Hereditary peers elected under the House of Lords Act 1999